This is a list of lakes of Europe with an average area greater than . Some smaller lakes may be missing from the list.

List
Reservoirs and smaller sub-basins that are already counted are not ranked.

See also

List of lakes by area

Europe
 
Lakes
Lakes

cs:Největší jezera v Evropě podle rozlohy